The cat o' nine tails is a type of multi-tailed whipping device.

Cat o' nine tails  may also refer to:

Books
 Cat O'Nine Tails (novel), a 2007 children's historical novel by Julia Golding
 Cat O'Nine Tails, 1971 novel by Paul Gillette from screenplay by Dario Argento

Music
Cat O' Nine Tails (band), a Finnish pirate metal band
"Cat O' Nine Tails", a composition by John Zorn from the 1999 album The String Quartets

Other uses
Typha latifolia, a perennial herbaceous plant commonly named "cat-o'-nine-tails"
The Cat o' Nine Tails, a 1971 Italian giallo film

See also
 Cat O'Nine Tales, a 2006 collection of short stories by Jeffrey Archer
 Cat of Many Tails, a 1949 mystery novel by Ellery Queen